Al-Majd Network is a group of general and specialized satellite television channels which includes five free-to-air channels and eight encrypted channels. The group has a strong Salafi Islamic orientation and is owned by Saudi businessman Fahad Abdulrahman Alshimeimri, with other partners.

History
Al-Majd Satellite Network was founded in November 2002.

As of 2022, Broadcasting and production is done in Riyadh and Cairo. There were additional production and broadcasting offices in Dubai, Amman, Rabat, Baghdad, Damascus and Beirut, in addition to tens of productive companies.

There used to be a live SMS chat in some channels until 2016.

Free-to-air channels

 Al-Majd Satellite Channel: Al-Majd Network’s main channel.
 Al-Majd Qur'an Channel: The first 24-hour Holy Qur’an television channel in the world.
 Al-Majd Hadeeth Channel: The first TV channel in the world that focuses on the quotes of Prophet Muhammad, as well as Hadeeth-related content.
 Al-Ilmiya (Al-Majd Religious Sciences): One of the first educational TV channels in the Middle East, focusing on Religious Sciences.
 Radio Dal for Children: Considered by the network as the first children’s radio in the world. Radio Dal hasn’t been available as an FM radio station as of yet.

Encrypted channels
 Al-Majd News Service (formerly known as “Al-Alam Al-Yaum”): The only world news service in Al-Majd Network as of now.
 Al-Majd Documentary Channel: The first documentary channel in the Arab World.
 Al-Majd Nature Channel: The first nature channel in the Arab World.
 Al-Majd Kids Channel (also known as “Majd”): Al-Majd Network’s main kids channel, which features mostly live-action children’s content.
 Basma: A 24/7 cartoon channel, and one of Al-Majd Network’s kids channels.
 Rawdah: The first channel in the Middle East that produces and airs educational content for children aged 2-5.
 Taghareed: A channel that specializes in children’s nasheeds.
 Masah: Al-Majd Network’s main variety & entertainment channel, with content that includes drama series.
 Al-Majd Zaman: Another variety & entertainment channel from Al-Majd Network, which airs some of the network’s archives. The channel has been aired annually throughout the summer since its TV launch in 2022.

External links

Islamic television networks
Television channels and stations established in 2002
Television stations in Saudi Arabia
Television stations in the Middle East and North Africa